Fun Club is the debut release by British punk rock band Gnarwolves. Released as a double EP on Tangled Talk Records, it features five original tracks, as well as four cover songs from Green Day, AFI, Black Flag and Converge.

Track listing

Personnel
Gnarwolves
Thom Weeks - Vocals/Guitar
Charlie Piper - Vocals/Bass
Max Weeks - Drums

Production
Wolfmask - Art

References

2011 debut EPs
Gnarwolves albums